Discography of the American rock and roll singer Chris Isaak.

Albums

Studio albums

Live albums

Compilation albums

Singles

Other appearances

Music videos

References

External links 

Discographies of American artists
Rock music discographies